James B. Bedingfield Jr. (October 24, 1924 – March 30, 2022) was an American lawyer and politician.

Bedingfield was born in Bandon, Oregon, and grew up in Coos Bay, Oregon. He graduated from Marshfield High School, in Coos Bay in 1942. Bedingfield then served in the United States Marine Corps during World War II. Bedingfield went to University of Oregon and Willamette University College of Law. He was admitted to the Oregon bar and lived with his wife and family in Coos Bay. Bedingfield served in the Oregon House of Representatives from 1964 to 1968. He died in Greeley, Colorado.

References

1924 births
2022 deaths
People from Bandon, Oregon
People from Coos Bay, Oregon
Military personnel from Oregon
University of Oregon alumni
Willamette University College of Law alumni
Oregon lawyers
Members of the Oregon House of Representatives